Semič (formerly also Semenič) is a settlement in southeastern Slovenia. It is the administrative seat of the Municipality of Semič.

Geography
The settlement is located in the traditional region of White Carniola (Bela krajina, part of Lower Carniola) and the Southeast Slovenia Statistical Region. It lies between the Kočevje Rog Plateau and the Gorjanci range of the Žumberak Mountains to the northeast. The slopes of the Gorjanci Hills are used for wine growing.

Semič is the site of an Iskra Kondenzatorji capacitor production plant, the largest employer in the region. In the 1980s the improper handling of PCB waste material led to serious pollution of nearby Krupa Creek and caused a major environmental scandal.

Hamlets

Semič contains a large number of hamlets, some of which used to be independent settlements. These include Coklovca, Gaber pri Semiču, Gora, Kašča, Kot pri Semiču, Krč, Mladica, Podturn, Sadinja Vas (Sodinsdorf), Sela pri Semiču (Sela bei Heiligengeist), Trata, Vavpča Vas (Amtmannsdorf), Vrh, and Vrtača pri Semiču.

The name of the hamlet of Gaber, in the southwest part of the settlement, was changed to Gaber pri Semiču in 1953.

The name of the former village of Sela pri Svetem Duhu (literally, 'Sela by the Holy Spirit') in the east-central part of settlement was changed to Sela pri Semiču (literally, 'Sela by Semič') in 1955. The name was changed on the basis of the 1948 Law on Names of Settlements and Designations of Squares, Streets, and Buildings as part of efforts by Slovenia's postwar communist government to remove religious elements from toponyms. Sela pri Semiču ceased to exist as an independent settlement in 2001, when it was annexed by Semič.

History

The settlement was first mentioned in the 13th century, when White Carniola down to the Kolpa River was colonised by Slovene and German (Gottschee) peasants. It gets its name from Semenič Castle, which used to stand on a hill above the settlement. The Semič parish church is dedicated to Saint Stephen and belongs to the Roman Catholic Diocese of Novo Mesto. It was first mentioned in written sources dating to 1228.

Part of the Carniolan county of Metlika, Semič was part of the Imperial Duchy of Carniola from 1364 onwards. Incorporated into the Habsburg monarchy, it was attacked by Ottoman forces several times; the settlement and its fortified church were completely destroyed in 1547

With Carniola, Semič became part of the Kingdom of Serbs, Croats and Slovenes (Yugoslavia) in 1918. It was the location of a Yugoslav Partisan base and airfield in World War II, from where Allied airmen and escaped and freed prisoners of war were airlifted to safety, led by Ralph Churches.

References

External links

 Semič at Geopedia
 Semič municipal site

Populated places in the Municipality of Semič